Jones & Bartlett Learning, a division of Ascend Learning, is a scholarly publisher. The name comes from Donald W. Jones, the company's founder, and Arthur Bartlett, the first editor.

History
In 1988, the company was named by New England Business Magazine as one of the 100 fastest-growing companies in New England.  In 1989, they opened their first office in London.  In 1993, they opened an office in Singapore, and an office in Toronto in 1994.  Their corporate headquarters moved to Sudbury, Massachusetts in 1995. In 2011, Jones & Bartlett Learning moved its offices in Sudbury and Maynard, Massachusetts to Burlington, Massachusetts, sharing a building with other Ascend Learning corporate offices.

See also 
 National Healthcareer Association
 DVP Media, purchased in 2009

References 

Educational publishing companies of the United States
Book publishing companies based in Massachusetts
Academic publishing companies
Educational book publishing companies
American companies established in 1983
Companies based in Burlington, Massachusetts
Publishing companies established in 1983
1983 establishments in Massachusetts